Sir Henry Russell, 2nd Baronet (1783–1852), was the son of Sir Henry Russell, 1st Baronet and his wife, Anne Barbara Whitworth 1763-1814.

Career in India
He was appointed British Resident to the court of Pune in 1809. He was then appointed to the more important court of Hyderabad State from 1810 until 1820, when he retired to England.

Russell was Private Secretary and assistant to James Achilles Kirkpatrick, British Resident at Hyderabad from 1798 until his death in 1805. Russell's career is discussed in some detail in William Dalrymple's 2002 history of British India, White Mughals, where he figures as a gifted but weak diplomat who, following the death of his superior, Kirkpatrick, seduced then abandoned Kirkpatrick's widow and had a brief affair with her.

Russell resigned from the Residency in 1820 to avert an investigation for corruption which would have led to his removal from office in disgrace. On an annual salary of £3,400, he had managed to accumulate a fortune of £85,000 over 10 years. In retirement he lived first at Sutton Park in Bedfordshire, then at Southernhay House, an architecturally notable listed building in Exeter. It was a newly built, freestanding, classical mansion of pillared grandeur.

Marriages and children
In October 1808 Russell married Jane Amelia Casamajor in Madras who died suddenly just two months later. A subsequent liaison with a local lady resulted in the birth of his daughter, who he named Mary Wilson in 1815. This child was brought to England when he retired, and was brought up in complete secrecy, with Sir Henry's friend, Major Robert Pitman, acting as a go-between. He provided an allowance for her, but refused to let Major Pitman tell her the identity of her father.  Mary married the Reverend William Langston Coxhead in 1839, who was incumbent of Kirby le Soken, Essex.

Sir Henry went on to marry a French Catholic from Pondicherry, Marie Clothilde Mottet de Fontaine 1793-1872 by whom he had six children.
 Henry 1819-1847, born at Hyderabad, who never married and died in Cairo
 Anne 1820-1902 born at Hyderabad, never married and died at Swallowfield Park
 Mary 1822-1894 born at Sutton Park, married her cousin, Dawson Cornelius Greene (son of Thomas Greene MP) of Whittington Hall, Lancashire in 1856
 Charles 1826-1883 born at Southernhay House (but baptised at Swallowfield), inherited the baronetcy from Sir Henry in 1852 becoming the 3rd Baronet.  An early recipient of the Victoria Cross, and a distinguished politician, he never married.
 George 1828-1898 born at Swallowfield Park and became a barrister and recorder. Married in 1867 Constance Lennox, granddaughter of the 4th Duke of Richmond.  They had two sons and a daughter.  He succeeded his brother Charles, becoming 4th baronet in 1883.
 Priscilla 1830-1924 born at Swallowfield, married George Brackenbury (diplomat) in 1865 and had a son and a daughter.

Swallowfield Park
In 1820 the Russell family - Sir Henry senior, and his two most successful sons, Charles and Sir Henry junior, pooled their resources and purchased Swallowfield Park, near Reading, Berkshire, where they and their descendants remained for over 150 years.

A focus on Swallowfield Park and the history of the Russells' life there can be found in "The East India Company at Home 1757 - 1857" edited by Margot Finn and Kate Smith, published by UCL Press 2018

References

1783 births
1852 deaths
Administrators in British India
Baronets in the Baronetage of the United Kingdom
British East India Company people